The term generativity was coined by the psychoanalyst Erik Erikson in 1950 to denote "a concern for establishing and guiding the next generation." He first used the term while defining the Care stage in his theory of the stages of psychosocial development.

Jonathan Zittrain adopted the term in 2006 to refer to the ability of a technology platform or technology ecosystem to create, generate or produce new output, structure or behavior without input from the originator of the system.

History 

In 1950 Erik Erikson created the term generativity to explain the 7th stage in his theory of the stages of psychosocial development. The 7th stage encompasses the middle ages of one's life, from 40 through 64. Generativity was defined as the “ability to transcend personal interests to provide care and concern for younger and older generations.” It took over 30 years for generativity to become a subject of empirical research. Modern psychoanalysts, starting in the early 1990s, have included a concern for one's legacy, referred to as an “inner desire for immortality”, in the definition of generativity.

More recently, the term has been adopted by people who deal with technology, first used by Johnathan Zittrain in 2006. Generativity in technology is defined as “the ability of a technology platform or technology ecosystem to create, generate or produce new output, structure or behavior without input from the originator of the system.” An example of this could be any computing platform, such as the iOS and Android mobile operating systems, for which other developers have created millions of unique applications. It has been argued that the open Internet is both an inspiration of generativity and a means to spread the products of generativity. However, some people including Johnathan Zittrain fear that society and technology are moving away from a generative internet, claiming “A shift in consumer priorities from generativity to stability will compel undesirable responses from regulators and markets and, if unaddressed, could prove decisive in closing today’s open computing environments.”

Use in Psychology 
Psychologically, generativity is concern for the future, a need to nurture and guide younger people and contribute to the next generation. Erikson argued that this usually develops during middle age (which spans ages 40 through 64) in keeping with his stage-model of psychosocial development. After having experienced old age himself, Erikson believed that generativity maintains a more important role in later life than he initially had thought.

In Erikson's theory Generativity is contrasted with Stagnation. During this stage, people contribute to the next generation through caring, teaching, engaging in creative work which contributes to society. Generativity involves answering the question "Can I Make My Life Count?", and in this process, finding your life's work and contributing to the development of others through activities such as volunteering, mentoring, and contributing to future generations. It has also been described as a concern for one's legacy, accepting the independence lives of family and increasing philanthropic pursuits. Generative concern leads to concrete goals and actions such as "providing a narrative schematic of the generative self to the next generation".

McAdams and de St. Aubin developed a 20-item scale to assess generativity, and to help discover who it is that is nurturing and leading the next generation. This model is not restricted to stages, with generativity able to be a concern throughout adulthood, not just in middle adulthood, as Erikson suggested. Example items include "I try to pass along the knowledge that I have gained through my experiences", "I have a responsibility to improve the neighborhood in which I live", and (reversed) "In general, my actions do not have a positive effect on other people."

Use in Technology 

Generativity in technology refers to cases where a technology supports the creation of novel products. Such technologies are referred to as generative systems. Canonical examples are the personal computer and the Internet. From its inception, the Internet has acted as a generative force allowing users to create and communicate in ways unimagined but foreseen by its creators who for this purpose built-in an openness and hardware and software agnosticism.

Zittrain was first to apply this term outside psychology, in cases where a generative technology leads to "unanticipated change through unfiltered contributions from broad and varied audiences." Zittrain has also highlighted that precarious nature of generative technology: arguing that features which, for instance, may enhance security and stability may, even unintentionally reduce or destroy a generativity in a system. He highlighted cases in which apparently innocuous producer, consumer, and government actions from a move away from PCs to one-way systems such as "smart" appliances cause a decline in generativity. As a result, he emphasised the need to be clear about treating generativity, rather than apparent means supporting this as the key valued characteristic of the system. In the case of the internet/PC complex this is its capacity as a generative networked grid, rather than traits associated with this, such as "open internet" or “network neutrality”. He termed a focus on these mere-means to the end of generativity a "myopic" "end-to-end theory" which confused means with ends. Zittrain argued:focusing on “network” without regard to a particular network policy’s influence on the design of network endpoints such as PCs. As a result of this focus, political advocates of end-to-end are too often myopic; many writers seem to presume current PC and OS architecture to be fixed in an “open” position. If they can be persuaded to see a larger picture, they may agree to some compromises at the network level. If complete fidelity to end-to-end network neutrality persists, our PCs may be replaced by information appliances or may undergo a transformation from open platforms to gated communities to prisons, creating a consumer information environment that betrays the very principles that animate end-to-end theory. ( p. 1978)

References

Further reading
 http://aging.wisc.edu/
 https://arstechnica.com/features/2008/06/book-review-2008-06-2-admin/
 https://bostonreview.net/archives/BR33.2/zittrain.php 
 Atmospheric satellite#Airplanes
 http://www.johnkotre.com/generativity.htm

Developmental psychology
Psychological concepts